Dovzhenko is a Ukrainian surname derived from the adjective довгий ("long").

The surname is used by the following people:
 Alexander Dovzhenko (1918–1995), Soviet-Ukrainian psychiatrist
 Grigoriy Dovzhenko (1899–1980), Ukrainian muralist
 Alexander Dovzhenko (1894–1956), Soviet-Ukrainian film director
 Olexandr Dovzhenko, Ukrainian poker player
 Sergei Dovzhenko (born 1972), Ukrainian serial killer
 Tetiana Dovzhenko (born 2002), Ukrainian rhythmic gymnast

See also
 
 Dovzhenko Film Studios

Ukrainian-language surnames